The 1984 NC State Wolfpack football team represented North Carolina State University during the 1984 NCAA Division I-A football season. The team's head coach was Tom Reed. NC State has been a member of the Atlantic Coast Conference (ACC) since the league's inception in 1953. The Wolfpack played its home games in 1984 at Carter–Finley Stadium in Raleigh, North Carolina, which has been NC State football's home stadium since 1966.

Schedule

Clemson was under NCAA probation, and was ineligible for the ACC title. Therefore, this game did not count in the league standings.

References

NC State
NC State Wolfpack football seasons
NC State Wolfpack football